Do Ajnabee (Hindi: दो अजनबी) is an upcoming Indian Hindi-language drama film directed by Sanjeev Kumar Rajput. The film stars Aarya Babbar, Aman Verma, Ankit Bathla and Anu Mitra in lead roles. The principle photography of the film begin in September 2022.

Cast 
 Aarya Babbar
 Aman Verma
 Ankit Bathla
 Anu Mitra
 Suraj Sharma

Plot
The film revolves around an employee, played by Aarya Babbar, working in a company. How he accidentally kills another employee of the company, played by Ankit Bathla who has the best car design ready. He killed him in order to collect money for his hospitalized brother's treatment. The story of the film takes a turn when a female protagonist enters in the films and she avenges the death of her boyfriend.

Filming
The film is mostly shot in Nainital, Uttarakhand, Mumbai, Maharashtra, India.

References

External links 
 

2023 films
Indian drama films
2020s Hindi-language films